Isaac M. Haswell House is a historic home located at Colonie in Albany County, New York, USA. It was built in 1880 and is a two-story farmhouse in the Italianate style. It has a one-story porch with ornate brackets, finials and carved rope decorations.

It was listed on the National Register of Historic Places in 1985.

References

Houses on the National Register of Historic Places in New York (state)
Italianate architecture in New York (state)
Houses completed in 1880
Houses in Albany County, New York
National Register of Historic Places in Albany County, New York
1880 establishments in New York (state)